Divide and rule or divide and conquer (Latin: divide et impera) is a method for gaining and maintaining power in politics and sociology.

Divide and rule or divide and conquer may also refer to:

Arts and entertainment

Film
 Divide and Conquer (film), a 1943 propaganda film
 Divide and Conquer: The Story of Roger Ailes, a 2018 American documentary

Literature
 Divide and Rule (collection), two science fiction novellas by L. Sprague de Camp, 1948
Divide and Rule (novella), 1939
 Divide and Rule: The Partition of Africa, 1880–1914, a 1991 history book by Henk Wesseling

Music
 Divide and Conquer (album), by Suicidal Angels, 2014
 "Divide and Conquer", a song by Hüsker Dü from the 1985 album Flip Your Wig
 "Divide and Conquer", a song by Story of the Year from the 2003 album Page Avenue
 "Divide and Conquer", a song by IDLES from the 2017 album Brutalism

Television episodes
 "Divide and Conquer" (Inhumans), 2017
 "Divide and Conquer" (Stargate SG-1), 2001
 "Divide and Conquer" (Teen Titans), 2003
 "Divide and Conquer" (Teenage Mutant Ninja Turtles episode), 1996
 "Divide and Conquer" (Transformers episode), 1984
 "Divide and Conquer" (Yu-Gi-Oh! Capsule Monsters episode), 2006
 "Divide and Conquer", an episode of Gangland (TV series), 2009
 "Divide" and "Conquer", two  episodes of Star vs. the Forces of Evil, 2018
 "Divide and Conquer", an episode of W.I.T.C.H., 2005

Other uses
 Defeat in detail, or divide and conquer, a military tactic
 Divide-and-conquer algorithm, in computer science
 Divide-and-conquer eigenvalue algorithm, in mathematics
 Divide and conquer algorithm for matrix multiplication, in mathematics

See also

 Divide and choose, a procedure for fair division of a continuous resource